The Mausoleum of Safavid princes() or Setti Fateme mausoleum() is a historical mausoleum in Isfahan, Iran. It is located in the Chaharsu-ye-Kuchak quarter.

In the southern side of the mausoleum's courtyard, there are tombs of three murdered Safavid princes, who were the children of Zobeyde Beygom, the daughter of Abbas I., and Issa Khan Ghourchibashi. The Qourchian class was the most important elit class in the Qizilbash class. They were special safavid guard and Abbass I. chose from them as his own bodyguard. These three princes were decapitated by the order of Safi I. Some people believe that the mausoleum is the burial place of Fatemeh, Musa al-Kadhim's daughter.

References 

Mausoleums in Isfahan